"The Tinker" is a short story by Orson Scott Card.  It appears in his short story collection The Worthing Saga.  Card first published "The Tinker" in the Vol. 1, No. 2 (1980) issue of Eternity SF magazine.

Plot summary
John Tinker spends every winter at his cousin’s inn in the town of Worthing.  While in town, John heals the townspeople with a special gift he inherited from Jason Worthing.  On a particularly bad winter when the snow is very deep, John does his best to help the sick people of Worthing, but some of them die anyway.  The residents blamed John for the deaths and kill some of the birds that he has also been taking care of.  When John finds he was unable to help his nephew, people think he is refusing to help because of the dead birds and run him out of town.  After he leaves, a very bad snowstorm hits Worthing, and more than half the people in town die.  When the storm finally ends, John returns to Worthing and is beaten to death by the remaining townspeople.

Connection to the Worthing Saga
This story takes place many years after the events in the story "Worthing Inn".  The story of John Tinker also appears in a much shorter form as a part of chapter 7 in Card's novel The Worthing Chronicle.

See also

List of works by Orson Scott Card
Orson Scott Card

External links
 The official Orson Scott Card website

1980 short stories
Short stories by Orson Scott Card